Frank Wilson (born 5 April 1944) is a Welsh former rugby union and professional rugby league footballer who played in the 1960s and 1970s.

Background
Frank Wilson was born in Cardiff, Wales.

Playing career

International honours
Frank Wilson won caps for the Wales national rugby league team while at St. Helens in the 1975 Rugby League World Cup against France, England, Australia, England, Australia, New Zealand, and France.

World Club Challenge Final appearances
Frank Wilson was an interchange/substitute in St. Helens 2-25 defeat by the 1975 NSWRFL season premiers, Eastern Suburbs Roosters in the unofficial 1976 World Club Challenge at Sydney Cricket Ground on Tuesday 29 June 1976.

Challenge Cup Final appearances
Frank Wilson played , i.e. number 5, in St. Helens' 16-13 victory over Leeds in the 1972 Challenge Cup Final during the 1971–72 season at Wembley Stadium, London on Saturday 13 May 1972.

County Cup Final appearances
Frank Wilson played , i.e. number 2, and scored 2-tries in St. Helens' 30-2 victory over Oldham in the 1968 Lancashire County Cup Final during the 1968–69 season at Central Park, Wigan on Friday 25 October 1968, and played , i.e. number 5, in the 4-7 defeat by Leigh in the 1970 Lancashire County Cup Final during the 1970–71 season at Station Road, Swinton on Saturday 28 November 1970.

BBC2 Floodlit Trophy Final appearances
Frank Wilson played , i.e. number 2, in St. Helens' 4-7 defeat by Wigan in the 1968-69 BBC2 Floodlit Trophy Final at Central Park, Wigan on Tuesday 17 December 1968, played  in the 5-9 defeat by Leeds in the 1970 BBC2 Floodlit Trophy Final during the 1970–71 season at Headingley Rugby Stadium, Leeds on Tuesday 15 December 1970, played  in the 8-2 victory over Rochdale Hornets in the 1971 BBC2 Floodlit Trophy Final during the 1971–72 season at Headingley Rugby Stadium, Leeds on Tuesday 14 December 1971, and played , and scored a try in the 22-2 victory over Dewsbury in the 1975 BBC2 Floodlit Trophy Final during the 1975–76 season at Knowsley Road, St. Helens on Tuesday 16 December 1975.

Player's No.6 Trophy Final appearances
Frank Wilson played left-, i.e. number 4, in Warrington's 9-4 victory over Widnes in the 1977–78 Players No.6 Trophy Final during the 1977–78 season at Knowsley Road, St. Helens on Saturday 28 January 1978.

Career records
Frank Wilson became one of less than twenty Welshmen to have scored more than 200-tries in their rugby league career.

Coaching career
Frank Wilson has coached University of Manchester rugby league, and New Broughton Rangers.

References

External links
Profile at saints.org.uk
Frank Wilson Appreciation Society
(archived by web.archive.org) Wakefield Trinity Wildcats - Interview with TC
'Wales 1975 Team - Seven of these players played for Salford at some stage' at flickr.com
(archived by web.archive.org) Wasteful Wales Get A Roasting
Cardiff RFC profile
Statistics at wolvesplayers.thisiswarrington.co.uk

1944 births
Living people
Cardiff City Blue Dragons players
Cardiff RFC players
Footballers who switched code
Rugby league centres
Rugby league five-eighths
Rugby league players from Cardiff
Rugby league wingers
Rugby union players from Cardiff
Salford Red Devils players
St Helens R.F.C. players
Wales national rugby league team players
Warrington Wolves players
Welsh rugby league coaches
Welsh rugby league players
Welsh rugby union players
Workington Town players